Uzbekistan District is a district of Fergana Region in Uzbekistan. The capital lies at the city Yaypan. The district consists of one city (Yaypan), 22 urban-type settlements (Shoʻrsuv, Avgʻon, Dahana Qaqir, Islom, Katta  Tagob, Qizil Qaqir, Kichik Tagob, Sardoba, Kudash, Kul elash, Qulibek, Qumbosti, Qoʻshqoʻnoq, Qoʻrgʻoncha, Nursux, Ovchi, Oyimcha Qaqir, Oqmachit, Oxta Tagob, Oʻqchi Dasht, Oʻqchi Rajabgardi, Iftixor) and 10 rural communities.

References

Districts of Uzbekistan
Fergana Region